The Phantom of the Turf is a 1928 American silent sports drama film directed by Duke Worne and starring Helene Costello, Rex Lease and Forrest Stanley.

Synopsis
When the owner of a thoroughbred racehorse is murdered, a man steps in as the guardian of his two children and helps unravel the mystery ahead of a major race.

Cast
 Helene Costello as Joan
 Rex Lease as John Nichols
 Forrest Stanley as Dunbarton
 Danny Hoy as Billy
 Clarence Wilson as The Lawyer

References

Bibliography
 Connelly, Robert B. The Silents: Silent Feature Films, 1910-36, Volume 40, Issue 2. December Press, 1998.

External links
 

1928 films
1920s sports drama films
1920s English-language films
American silent feature films
American sports drama films
Films directed by Duke Worne
American horse racing films
Rayart Pictures films
1920s American films
Silent American drama films
Silent sports drama films